Aliabad-e Dutu (also Romanized as ‘Alīābād-e Dūtū; also known as ‘Alīābād, Alīābād-e Dotū, and ‘Alīābād-e Now) is a village in Balyan Rural District, in the Central District of Kazerun County, Fars Province, Iran. At the 2017 census, its population was 219, in 60 families.

References 

Populated places in Kazerun County